"One Broken Heart for Sale" is an Elvis Presley song taken from the soundtrack to the film, It Happened at the World's Fair. It was released as a single by RCA Victor on January 29, 1963. "One Broken Heart for Sale" reached number 11 on the Hot 100 chart and remained on this chart for nine weeks. It was certified gold by the RIAA in 1992. It reached number 21 on the R&B chart and stayed on this chart for four weeks. In the UK, it peaked at number 12.

Charts

References

1962 songs
1963 singles
Elvis Presley songs